The 2021–22 Conference USA men's basketball season began with practices in October 2021, followed by the start of the 2021–22 NCAA Division I men's basketball season in November. Conference play starts in late December 2021 and will end in March 2022, after which all 14 member teams will participate in the 2022 Conference USA tournament at The Ford Center at The Star in Frisco, Texas. The tournament champion is guaranteed a selection to the 2022 NCAA tournament.

Preseason 
UAB was picked as a narrow favorite to finish first in Conference USA by a poll of the league's 14 head coaches.

Preseason Poll

() first place votes

Preseason All-Conference teams

Head coaches

Coaching changes 
Rodney Terry resigned as head coach of UTEP after three seasons to accept an assistant coaching position at Texas.Joe Golding was then hired as the new head coach of the Miners.

Coaches 

Notes: 
 All records, appearances, titles, etc. are from time with current school only. 
 Year at school includes 2021–22 season.
 Overall and C-USA records are from time at current school and are through the end of the 2020–21 season.

Regular season

Conference matrix

Player of the week

All-Conference Teams and Awards

References